The letters wlen may refer to:

 WLEN-FM, a radio station (103.9 FM) licensed to Adrian Michigan, United States
 Wleń, a town in western Poland